The Indian Historical Review is a peer-reviewed academic journal that aims to provide a forum in all areas of historical studies, ranging from early times to contemporary history.

The journal while focussing mainly on the Indian subcontinent has carried historical writings on other parts of the world as well. It is published in association with the Indian Council of Historical Research.

The journal is a member of the Committee on Publication Ethics (COPE).

Abstracting and indexing 
Indian Historical Review is abstracted and indexed in:

 DeepDyve
 Portico
 Dutch-KB
 Thomson Reuters: Arts & Humanities Citation Index
 EBSCO
 OCLC
 Ohio
 ICI
 Bibliography of Asian Studies (BAS)
 J-Gate

References 

 COPE
 http://ichr.ac.in/journals.html

External links 
 
 Homepage

SAGE Publishing academic journals
Publications established in 1999
History journals